Steller's eider (Polysticta stelleri) is a migrating Arctic diving duck that breeds along the coastlines of eastern Russia and Alaska. It is the rarest, smallest, and fastest flying of the eider species. Amongst the Inupiat, Steller's eider is known as the "bird that sat in the campfire", referring to the burnt-ish color of the male's belly.

Due to the extensive contraction of its breeding range, the Alaska-breeding population of Steller's eider was listed as vulnerable in 1997 by the International Union for the Conservation of Nature (IUCN). The species is protected in Russia and the U.S. and is the subject of an ongoing recovery plan by the European Union and  U.S. Fish and Wildlife Service.

Taxonomy 
Steller’s eider is in the family Anatidae along with other ducks, geese, and swans and is the only species in the genus Polysticta. Despite its name, it is more distantly related than all other extant eider species which are part of the Somateria genus.

Steller's eider was separated from other eider species into its own genus in 1945 due to behavioral and anatomical differences. Accordingly, Steller's eider may provide a taxonomic link between the eider species in the Somateria genus and the other sea ducks.

Description

Steller’s eider is the smallest of four eider species, with both females and males weighing 800 grams on average (1.8 pounds). They have a compact body with a relatively large head, long tail, and a long, thick bill.  The males assume their breeding plumage from early winter to midsummer with a black cap, chin, throat, eye-ring, and rump, with a white head and shoulders, light-green patches behind the head and in front of the eye, cinnamon breast and shoulders marked with a prominent black spot. The wings appear to be striped white, with an iridescent bluish-purple background colour and white border. They have palmate feet (3 fully webbed toes) which are a dark bluish-gray, the same color as the legs. In mid-summer to fall, males assume their non-breeding plumage which is primarily dark brown with a white-bordered bluish speculum (secondary feathers) on their wing. Females are a dark to cinnamon brown with a pale-white eye-ring, similar to the lighter brown juveniles. Females also have iridescent bluish-purple speculums with a white border running the entire length of the secondaries.

Habitat and Distribution 
During the winter, Steller’s eiders occupy coastal bays and lagoons that offer suitable forage while occasionally feeding in deeper waters that remain adequately sheltered. They nest in marshy tundra along the coast, in areas dominated by water sedge and pendant grass. Within the marshy tundra, they designate specific areas to build their nest, preferring elevated surfaces covered by shallow vegetation such as mosses and grasses. Their molting habitat consists of relatively shallow coastal lagoons that offer viable eelgrass and tidal flats for foraging and beaches and sandbars to rest while they remain flightless.

Population Distributions 
There are three recognized breeding populations of Steller’s eiders, one in Alaska and two in Arctic Russia.

 The Russian-Atlantic population makes its breeding ground west of the Khatanga River in western Siberia and winters in the Barents and Baltic seas.
 The Russian-Pacific population nests on the east side of the Khatanga River and spends its winters in the southern Bering Sea and northern Pacific Ocean.
 The Alaska-breeding population nests on the Arctic Coastal Plain and in exceptionally small numbers in the Yukon-Kuskokwim Delta, and winters in the southern Bering Sea and northern Pacific ocean. Less than 1% of the world’s Steller’s eiders nest in Alaska.
Some non-breeding populations will also spend their summers in northern Norway, on the east coast of Russia and adjacent waters, and south-west Alaska.

Behaviour and ecology

Feeding and Diet 

Steller's eiders forage primarily near the shore by employing various techniques such as briefly diving and swimming underwater (to a maximum depth of 9m), wading and dabbling. They feed by surface techniques more than other sea ducks and prefer relatively small prey. Studies have shown that Steller's eiders are specialists in catching highly mobile prey but may limit their diet to crustaceans even when higher energy sources, such as capelin, become available. This discrepancy in food preferences may be due to their inability to exploit deeper habitats. Steller's eiders also feed on mollusks, echinoderms, polychaete worms, and mussels during the winter. While in the tundra during the summer months, they feed on aquatic insects and plant material such as crowberries and pondweeds.

Reproduction 
According to banding studies, Steller's eiders can live up to 21 years and four months and reach sexual maturity at two years. Males engage in leks on the wintering and breeding grounds, where groups of males attempt to win over an individual female with elaborate displays. Males court females in silence by displaying a consistent sequence of side-to-side head-shaking while swimming towards and away from their potential female partner. Steller's eiders tend to form breeding pairs during late-winter to early-spring instead of the fall like most waterfowl. Breeding pairs arrive at their nesting sites as early as the beginning of June.

Females establish their nests in marshy tundra close to permanent open water that has additional access to small ponds. They specifically select mounds or ridges dominated by mosses, lichens, and grasses. Their nest is shallow, lined with grasses, moss, lichens, and down feathers plucked from the female's breast, who builds the nest without help from the male.

Females usually lay 1-8 olive to brownish-orange eggs per breeding cycle. She then incubates the eggs alone for about 25 days. The young are precocial and hatch between late June and late July with their eyes open and sporting downy feathers. However, predators consume the majority of eggs before they are hatched. The young go to the water shortly after hatching and immediately feed themselves, without relying on their mother for food. Regardless of their feeding independence, females will stay within 700m of their nest for up to 35 days post-hatch, while the young begin flying approximately 40 days after hatching. It is not uncommon for one female to assume care of two or more sets of young from a different mother.

Vocalization 
Males make a low jumbled growling sound, while females make a discrete qua-haaa sound of a similar tone. Males have also been reported to produce a repetitive crackling sound when females go underwater. Notably, the males court the females in silence. During flight, their feathers produce a mechanical whistling sound.

Molt 
After breeding, Steller's eiders gather in high-density flocks to synchronously molt (replace all their feather at the same time) in Arctic lagoons in northwest Asia and along the Alaska peninsula. They remain flightless for about three weeks, but the entire flight-feather molt lasts from July to October.  Juveniles molt first, followed by adult males and adult females.

Threats 
The decline of Alaska-breeding Steller’s eider population is predominantly unclear. It has been attributed to changes to the Arctic climate, increased predation rates, hunting and consumption of lead shot, and disease. Since their listing, additional threats such as exposure to oil and other contaminants have been identified.

Climate Change 
Climate change may pose the greatest threat to Steller’s eiders. Primarily, climate change has caused Arctic tundra ponds to disappear, limiting the extent of suitable habitat for the species. Climate change has also been implicated in the collapse of rodent populations, forcing predators to exploit alternative prey such as the Steller’s eider eggs and young.

Lead Poisoning 
High levels of lead have been reported in Steller’s eiders that nest on the Alaska Arctic Coastal plain and in Spectacled Eiders that occupy the Yukon-Kuskokwim Delta, where Steller’s Eiders continue to nest in highly reduced densities. Further studies have also shown that lead concentration was higher in individuals located close to industrialized regions than non-industrialized regions.

Nest Predation 
Nest predation by the Arctic fox, Pomarine jaeger, snowy owl, and common raven pose the greatest threat to Steller’s eider's nesting success rate. Studies have shown that Steller’s eider reproduce most successfully when lemmings are abundant, most likely resulting from predators transitioning between prey during years of lemming decline.

Natural Resource Exploitation 
The exploitation of natural resources such as oil and gas contributes to Steller’s eider habitat loss. Regional exploitation projects have increased the risk of spill contamination. At the same time, an increase in human presence and infrastructure have contributed to the demise of suitable habitats.

Disease 
Steller’s eiders transport the Avian Influenza virus between Eurasia and North America during their migrations. Many recent studies have reported prominent infection rates amongst the Steller’s eiders in Alaska, ranging from 0.2% to 5%. It has been suggested that 80% of Steller’s eiders in Alaska are carriers of Avian Influenza antibodies.

E.coli has also been reported in Alaska-breeding Steller’s eiders and is thought to be linked to wastewater from local human communities and industrialization.

Recovery plan 
Two-recovery plans have been implemented to restore healthy populations of Steller’s eiders.  The European Union action plan, published in 2000 and The U.S. Fish and Wildlife Service action plan, originally published in 2002.

U.S. Fish and Wildlife Service Action Plan 
The  Recovery Plan for the Alaska-breeding population of Steller’s eider (Polysticta stelleri) was last revised by the U.S. Fish and Wildlife Service in September 2020. The primary focus of this plan is to ensure a viable breeding population of Steller’s eider in northern Alaska, rather than aiming for two subpopulations in northern and western Alaska. The plan aims to:

 Increase the abundance of Steller’s eiders
 Ensure adequate population distribution throughout the Utqiaġvik Triangle and Arctic Coastal Plain survey areas
 Increase the number of Alaska-breeding Steller’s eiders

The recovery plan is primarily limited by uncertainty about the Alaska-breeding Steller’s eider’s ecology and population dynamics. Thus, the action plan coincides with an effort to conduct research and enhance knowledge of the species.

The U.S. Fish and Wildlife Service predicts that if the plan is adequately funded and properly implemented, the recovery criteria could be met by 2050. The total cost is estimated at $15,675,000.

Critical Habitat Designation 
In 2001 the U.S. Fish and Wildlife Service designated five critical breeding habitats on the Yukon-Kuskokwim Delta and four marine water units along the coast of southwest Alaska that are critical for molting, feeding, and wintering. The entire designation includes approximately 2,800 square miles and 850 miles of coastline.

Conservation status 

In 2016, the global population of Steller’s eider was estimated at 110,000-125,000 individuals and classified as vulnerable by the International Union for the Conservation of Nature (IUCN).

In 1992, the U.S. Fish and Wildlife Service reviewed the status of the Steller’s eider and concluded that listing the species as endangered was warranted, but precluded by higher species listing priorities. One year later, in 1993, they reconsidered the Steller’s eider’s status and supported the listing of the Alaska-breeding population, but did not include the Russian-breeding populations. Finally, the Alaska-breeding population was listed as threatened in 1997. The primary reason for listing was the near disappearance of the Yukon-Kuskokwim Delta population, contracting the Alaskan nesting sites to the Arctic Coastal Plain and increasing the population’s risk of extirpation.`

Cultural Significance 
Steller’s eiders were once legally harvested by waterfowl hunters in the U.S., but all legal hunting ended in 1991. Egging and subsistence hunting still occurs in Alaska, but is  uncommon. The degree of subsistence hunting in Russia and its effect on the population is poorly documented.

References

External links

 
 
 
 
 
 
 

Steller's eider
Birds of the Arctic
Birds of North Asia
Native birds of Alaska
Steller's eider
Steller's eider
Holarctic birds